Manuel De Sica (24 February 1949 – 5 December 2014) was an Italian composer.

Born in Rome, the son of Vittorio De Sica and María Mercader, De Sica enrolled at the Accademia Nazionale di Santa Cecilia, in which he studied with Bruno Maderna. He debuted as a composer for his father's film A Place for Lovers (1968).

In 1993, De Sica won the Nastro d'Argento for Best Score for Carlo Verdone's Al lupo, al lupo. In 1996 he won the David di Donatello for Best Score for Carlo Lizzani's Celluloide. In 2005 he was honored with the title of Commendatore of the Italian Republic.

De Sica died of a heart attack on 5 December 2014 at the age of 65, in Rome.

Selected filmography
 
 The Garden of the Finzi-Continis (1970)
 Gang War (1971)
 The Crimes of the Black Cat (1972)
 Gang War in Naples (1972)
 Lo chiameremo Andrea (1972)
  A Brief Vacation (1973)
 The Voyage (1974)
  Cagliostro (1975)
  Quel movimento che mi piace tanto (1976)
  La madama (1976)
  The Twist (1976)
  La portiera nuda (1976)
  Canne mozze (1977)
  Dear Father (1979)
  I'm Photogenic (1980)
  Sunday Lovers (1980)
  I'm Going to Live by Myself (1982)
  A Boy and a Girl (1983)
  Cuori nella tormenta (1984)
  Lui è peggio di me (1984)
  Vacanze in America (1984)
  Love at First Sight (1985)
  Soldati - 365 all'alba (1987)
  Il commissario Lo Gatto (1987)
  Taste of Life (1988) 
  The Icicle Thief (1989) 
  Count Max (1991)
  To Want to Fly (1991)
  Cemetery Man (1994)
  Vacanze di Natale '95 (1995)
  A spasso nel tempo (1996)
  Nuda proprietà vendesi (1997)
  Love Is Not Perfect (2012)

References

External links

1949 births
2014 deaths
Italian film score composers
Italian male film score composers
Musicians from Rome
David di Donatello winners
Nastro d'Argento winners
20th-century Italian musicians
Italian people of Spanish descent
20th-century Italian male musicians